Thornwood is the name of several places:
In the United Kingdom
Thornwood, Essex
Thornwood, Glasgow, Scotland
Thornwood Common, Essex

In the United States
Thornwood, New York
Thornwood, Washington
Thornwood, South Elgin, a planned community in Illinois